Havana Cathedral (Catedral de San Cristóbal) is one of eleven Catholic cathedrals on the island. It is located in the Plaza de la Catedral on Calle Empedrado, between San Ignacio y Mercaderes, Old Havana. The thirty by forty-nine meters rectangular church serves as the seat of the Roman Catholic Archdiocese of San Cristóbal de la Habana. Christopher Columbus’ remains were kept in the cathedral between 1796 and 1898 before they were taken to Seville Cathedral.

It was built between 1748 and 1777 and was consecrated in 1782.

History 

The largest missionary group in Havana was the Society of Jesus. After extensive petitioning and the purchase of a piece of land in the Plaza by Diego Evelino Hurtado de Compostela, Bishop of Santiago de Cuba, a permit was granted. The cathedral is set in the former Plaza de La Ciénaga. In 1727 plans to build a church, convent and collegium were approved and the project began to take form. The plaza is located on the site of a swamp that was drained and used as a naval dockyard before the cathedral was built. The Jesuits began construction of the cathedral in 1748 on the site of an earlier church and it was completed in 1777, well after King Charles III of Spain expelled the Jesuits from the island in 1767. The cathedral once held remains of Christopher Columbus.

In 1796, after the Peace of Basel was signed and Spain ceded most of Hispaniola to France, the remains of Columbus were moved and laid to rest in the Havana Cathedral's Altar of the Gospel. The gravestone read: Oh Remains and Image of Great Columbus, Be Preserved One Thousand Years in the Funerary Urn. The remains were returned to Spain in 1898 after the Cuban War of Independence.

In the early 19th century, the baroque altars were replaced by neoclassical ones, urged by Bishop Espada, a fervent admirer of Neoclassicism and the original wood ceilings were plastered over.

Roman Catholic Archdiocese of San Cristóbal de la Habana

The Roman Catholic Metropolitan Archdiocese of San Cristobal de la Habana is one of three Catholic archdioceses in Cuba.

This Latin Rite or Roman Rite diocese was erected on 10 September 1787 by Pope Pius VI, from the territory of the then–Diocese of Santiago de Cuba. When it was erected, the new diocese encompassed the secular provinces of Santa Clara, Matanzas, Havana, and Pinar del Río in Cuba and Florida and Louisiana in what is now the United States of America. On 25 April 1793 the diocese lost territory for what would be the first of four territorial losses when the Diocese of Louisiana and the Two Floridas (Saint Louis of New Orleans) was erected. The diocese again lost territory on 20 February 1903 when the dioceses of Pinar del Río and Cienfuegos were erected, and then again on 10 December 1912 upon the erection of the diocese of Matanzas. Eventually the diocese was elevated to the Metropolitan See of Sancti Christophori de Habana, San Cristobal de la Habana on 6 January 1925. Pope Francis accepted the resignation of Cardinal Jaime Lucas Ortega y Alamino as Archbishop of Havana on 26 April 2016. The archdiocese had one auxiliary bishop, Bishop Juan de Dios Hernández-Ruiz, S.J., at the beginning of 2019, in which year he was appointed Bishop of Pinar del Rio.

The archdiocese  encompasses  and has two suffragan dioceses, Matanzas and Pinar del Río. According to a 2004 estimate there were a total of 3.9 million people living within the confines of the diocese, 71.8% or 2.8 million of whom were Roman Catholic. There were 49 diocesan priests and 62 religious priests, totaling 111 priests serving the faithful of the diocese. With these figures, there were approximately 25,225 Catholics per priest. There were 23 permanent deacons and 79 men-religious and 348 women-religious. In 2004, there were 102 established parishes.

Architecture 

The cathedral's Baroque front elevation has asymmetrical bell towers the details of the facade are similar to those of the San Carlos and San Ambrosio Seminary which is part of the same ecclesiastical complex. One can see fossilized marine fauna and flora in the stone walls as the cathedral is, as many buildings in Havana are, constructed out of blocks of coral. It has a central nave, two side aisles and eight side chapels. The central arches of the nave are buttressed by eight stone flying arches located above the side aisles on the exterior of the cathedral as can be seen in the section. The flying arches, the dome over the transept or the orange roof tiles cannot be seen from the square. The width of the central nave is fifteen meters. The plan forms a Latin cross.

Artworks 

The cathedral contains a number of sculptures, paintings and frescoes. There is a statute of Apolinar Serrano (July 23, 1833 – June 15, 1876) who was a Spanish bishop of Havana and was buried in the cathedral. Copies of paintings in the side chapels by Rubens and Murillo on the altars. There is a sculpture of Saint Christopher, Patron Saint of Havana, which dates from 1632 and was made by Martín de Andújar Cantos in Seville, Spain. Above the altar are three fading frescoes by Italian artist Giuseppe Perovani, a neoclassical artist who was commissioned by Bishop Juan José Díaz de Espada y Fernánez de Landa of the Roman Catholic Archdiocese of San Cristóbal de la Habana to paint three scenes: The Delivery of the Keys, The Last Supper and The Ascension. There is also the canvas of the Virgin of the Immaculate Conception, Patroness of the cathedral. Perovani was also the author of the canvas of the orange chapel (color of the ceiling) of the Virgin of Loreto, blessed by Bishop Morell de Santa Cruz in 1755. On the altar are sculptures and goldsmith works made in Rome during the first half of the 19th century. On the walls the oil paintings painted by the Frenchman Jean Baptiste Vermay, founder and first director of the Academy of Painting and Drawing of San Alejandro, the same creator of the interior works of the El Templete, in the original enclave of the city.

The cathedral stands within the area of Old Havana that UNESCO designated a World Heritage Site in 1982.

Gallery

See also

 List of buildings in Havana
 List of Jesuit sites

Notes

References

External links
 Digital Photographic Archive of Historic Havana
Panoramic Virtual Tour in Cathedral Square
"San Cristóbal Cathedral" picture gallery

 

Religious buildings and structures in Havana
Roman Catholic churches in Havana
18th-century Roman Catholic church buildings in Cuba
Roman Catholic cathedrals in Cuba
Spanish Colonial architecture in Cuba
Roman Catholic churches completed in 1777
Buildings and structures in Havana
Tourist attractions in Havana